Linda Bhreathnach is an Irish writer, director and actress.

From Ros Muc, Conamara in the west of Ireland, Bhreathnach wrote and directed short film Adulting 
 
Among other awards Linda's film 'Adulting' won best short film at the London Irish Film festival and she won a Rising Star Award with Irish Screen America (New York and Los Angeles) for her work on the same film.

Linda is a former Miss Galway (2007) and a runner up for Miss Ireland in the same year.

In 2017, Bhreathnach wrote and directed Native, a short film shot in Ireland starring Patrick Bergin. Native was nominated for Best Cinematography by Sean T. O'Meallaigh and Best National/International Short Film by Linda Bhreathnach at the Richard Harris International Film Festival. Native was produced by Linda Bhreathnach and by Marina Donahue of Corner Bar Pictures.

In 2018, Bhreathnach released the short film My Mother is my Priest. The film is described as a 'celebration of mothers' and was released by Linda Bhreathnach Films. Bhreathnach created, wrote, directed and performed in the film. In 2021, Linda wrote the screenplay 'Girleen' a contemporary film on the life of women and girls in the modern world.

She played the part as "Róise de Burca" in the long-running soap opera Ros na Rún. While in character Bhreathnach participated in the first Lesbian kiss episode on Irish television. Bhreathnach also had a starring role in the critically acclaimed political drama The Running Mate and in the BBC/TG4 drama Seacht / Seven.

Filmography

Television

Film

References

External links
Sunday Independent Article
The Running Mate

Living people
Actresses from County Galway
Irish soap opera actresses
Irish television actresses
Irish filmmakers
TG4 people
21st-century Irish actresses
Year of birth missing (living people)